, born in Tokyo, was a Japanese print-maker. He was the father of the sōsaku-hanga movement in twentieth century Japan, and a photographer. His work was part of the painting event in the art competition at the 1932 Summer Olympics.

Biography
Onchi came from an aristocratic family that had close connections with the imperial family. As a child, he received the same kind of education that a prince received. Onchi was trained in both traditional calligraphy and modern western art. After contacts with Takehisa Yumeji in 1909, between 1910 and 1915, he studied oil painting and sculpture at the Tokyo School of Fine Arts (Tōkyō Bijutsu Gakkō). In 1912, he founded the print and poetry magazine called "Tsukubae".

Onchi was also a book designer in the early days when it was impossible for sōsaku-hanga artists to survive by just doing creative prints. He designed over 1000 books in his career. In 1928 he joined with seven other sōsaku hanga artists to work on the 100 Views of New Tokyo series, to which he contributed thirteen prints. He was described as having the most "forceful personality" of the group, with the "widest intellectual interests and the deepest intellectual convictions."

In 1939, he founded the First Thursday Society (Ichimokukai), which was crucial to the postwar revival of the sōsaku-hanga movement. The society held artist gatherings once a month in Onchi’s house. Members such as Gen Yamaguchi (1896–1976) and Sekino Jun'ichirō (1914–1988) discussed subjects of prints. The American connoisseurs Ernst Hacker, William Hartnett and Oliver Statler also attended. The First Thursday Collection (Ichimoku-shū), a collection of prints by members to circulate to each other, was produced in 1944. Through the First Thursday Society, Onchi provided aspiring young artists with resources and comradeship during the war years when resources were scarce and censorship severe. After the war, he emerged as the leader of the sōsaku-hanga movement that flourished in the international art scene.

Style and technique
Onchi's prints range from early representational to postwar abstract prints. As an early advocate of the sōsaku-hanga movement, Onchi believed that artistic creation originates from the self. He was more interested in expressing subjective emotions through abstract prints than in replicating images and forms in the objective world. His prints evoke lyrical and poetic mood. He said:

Art is not to be understood by the mind but by the heart. If we go back to its origin, painting is expressed in color and form by the heart, and it should never be limited to a world of reflected forms captured by visual sense. Therefore, expression of the heart through color and forms separated from color and form in the real world is that true realm of painting. I will for the time call this type of work the 'lyrique'.

Onchi innovated by incorporating fabrics, string, paper blocks, fish fins, and leaves in his prints.

Photography
From around 1932, Onchi worked on the design of a number of books about photography published by Genkōsha and Ars. He also became interested in photography. Through the 1930s and 1940s, Onchi worked in the spirit of shinkō shashin. He worked on plants, animals and objets, and also created photograms.

Onchi was sent to China in 1939 and later the same year returned to Tokyo and had an exhibition of his Chinese works.

Onchi exhibited his photograms in 1951 but otherwise dropped out of photography. He died in Tokyo on 3 June 1955.

Collections 
Onchi's works are held in several museums worldwide, including the National Museum of Modern Art, Tokyo, the National Museum of Modern Art, Kyoto, the University of Michigan Museum of Art, the Museum of Fine Arts, Boston, the Smart Museum of Art, the British Museum, the Museum of Modern Art, the Portland Art Museum, the Saint Louis Art Museum, the Brooklyn Museum, the Worcester Art Museum, the Harvard Art Museums, and the Art Gallery of New South Wales.

Notes

References
Jinbo Kyōko. "Onchi Kōshirō". In Nihon shashinka jiten / 328 Outstanding Japanese Photographers. Tokyo: Tankōsha, 2000. .  
Swinton, Elizabeth de Sabato. The Graphic Art of Onchi Kôshirô: Innovation and Tradition. New York: Garland Press, 1986.

External links
Onchi's works at Fine Arts Museums of San Francisco
Biography at British Museum

Japanese photographers
Japanese printmakers
Artists from Tokyo
1891 births
1955 deaths
Sosaku hanga artists
Olympic competitors in art competitions
20th-century Japanese artists
20th-century photographers
20th-century printmakers